Acrotaphus wiltii is a species of ichneumon wasp in the family Ichneumonidae. It can be found in North America.

References

External links

 

Ichneumoninae
Insects described in 1870
Taxa named by Ezra Townsend Cresson
Hymenoptera of North America